Clodoaldo Lopes do Carmo (27 April 1968 in São Paulo) is a retired Brazilian athlete who specialised in the 3000 metres steeplechase. He represented his country at two Olympic Games, in 1992 and 1996, making it to the final on the first occasion.

He has later worked as a coach, among others of Solonei da Silva and Kléberson Davide.

Competition record

Personal bests
1500 metres – 3:56.10 (Athens 1986)
3000 metres – 7:45.34 (Koblenz 1992)
3000 metres steeplechase – 8:19.80 (Brussels 1992)

References

1968 births
Living people
Sportspeople from São Paulo (state)
Brazilian male steeplechase runners
Athletes (track and field) at the 1992 Summer Olympics
Athletes (track and field) at the 1996 Summer Olympics
Olympic athletes of Brazil